Godot  is a cross-platform, free and open-source game engine released under the MIT license. It was initially developed by Argentine software developers Juan Linietsky and Ariel Manzur for several companies in Latin America prior to its public release. The development environment runs on multiple operating systems including Linux, BSDs, macOS, and Microsoft Windows. It is designed to create both 2D and 3D games targeting PC, mobile, and web platforms and can also be used to develop non-game software, including editors.

Features 

Godot aims to offer a fully integrated game development environment. It allows developers to create a game, needing no other tools beyond those used for content creation (visual assets, music, etc.). The engine's architecture is built around the concept of a tree of "nodes". Nodes are organized inside of "scenes", which are reusable, instanceable, inheritable, and nestable groups of nodes. All game resources, including scripts and graphical assets, are saved as part of the computer's file system (rather than in a database). This storage solution is intended to facilitate collaboration between game development teams using software version control systems.

Supported platforms 
The engine supports deployment to multiple platforms and allows specification of texture compression and resolution settings for each platform. The website provides binaries only for the editor platforms, and exporting projects to other platforms is done within the Godot editor.

The Godot editor, used for creating Godot games, supports the following platforms:
 Desktop platforms Linux, macOS, and Windows, distributed on the website, on Steam, and on Itch. BSD is also supported, but must be compiled manually.
 Web platform HTML5, WebAssembly with the web editor.
 Android phones and tablets (available as of Godot 3.5).

The engine supports exporting projects to many more platforms, including all of the editor platforms. Currently supported platforms as of Godot 4.0 are:
 Mobile platforms Android, iOS
 Desktop platforms Linux, macOS, Microsoft Windows (Universal Windows Platform), BSD (must be compiled manually)
 Web platform HTML5, WebAssembly.
 Virtual/extended reality platforms HTC Vive, Valve Index, Oculus Rift, Oculus Go, Oculus Quest, all Microsoft MR headsets, Apple's ARKit and many more.

Even though the Godot engine can be run on consoles, Godot does not support it officially as it is an open-source project rather than a licensed company and they cannot publish platform-specific code under open-source license. However, it is still possible to port games to consoles thanks to services provided by third-party companies.

For CPU architectures, Godot officially supports x86 on all desktop platforms (both 32-bit and 64-bit where available) and has official ARM support on macOS, mobile platforms, and standalone Oculus platforms (both 32-bit and 64-bit where available). The web platform uses 32-bit WebAssembly. Support for ARM, RISC-V, and PowerPC Linux is unofficial and experimental.

Scripting 

Godot supports a variety of programming languages for making games, including the integrated language GDScript, C++ and C#. Additionally, the engine includes GDNative, a facility for creating bindings with other languages. Officially-supported GDNative languages include C and C++. Community-supported languages include Rust, Nim, Haskell, Clojure, Swift, and D. Visual coding is also supported, via the built-in language VisualScript, designed to be a visual equivalent to GDScript. Visual Scripting was removed from the core engine in Godot 4.0. Godot games running in the Browser can interface with the browser's JavaScript code.

The Godot editor includes a text editor with auto indentation, syntax highlighting and code completion. It also features a debugger with the ability to set breakpoints and program stepping.

GDScript 

Godot has its own built-in scripting language, GDScript, a high-level, dynamically typed programming language which is syntactically similar to Python. Unlike Python, GDScript is optimized for Godot's scene-based architecture and can specify strict typing of variables. Godot's developers have stated that many alternative third-party scripting languages such as Lua, Python, and Squirrel were tested before deciding that using a custom language allowed for superior optimization and editor integration. In version 4.0, a new feature called Typed array was implemented on GDScript. This allows users to easily change a regular array to typed and vice-versa without changing much code. 

A simple "Hello world" program can be written like so:
func _ready():
	print("Hello World")

More complex programs, such as this one generating a Fibonacci sequence, are also possible:
func _ready():
	var nterms = 5
	print("Fibonacci sequence:")
	for i in range(nterms):
		print(fibonacci(i))

func fibonacci(n):
	if n <= 1:
		return n
	else:
		return fibonacci(n - 1) + fibonacci(n - 2)

Rendering 
Godot's graphics engine uses OpenGL ES 3.0 for all supported platforms; otherwise, OpenGL ES 2.0 is used. Vulkan is supported starting version 4.0 and also includes the possibility of support for Metal using MoltenVK. The engine supports normal mapping, specularity, dynamic shadows using shadow maps, baked and dynamic global illumination, and full-screen post-processing effects like bloom, depth of field, high-dynamic-range rendering, and gamma correction. A simplified shader language, similar to GLSL, is also incorporated. Shaders can be used for materials and post-processing. Alternatively, they can be created by manipulating nodes in a visual editor.

Godot also includes a separate 2D graphics engine that can operate independently of the 3D engine. The 2D engine supports features such as lights, shadows, shaders, tile sets, parallax scrolling, polygons, animations, physics, and particles. It is also possible to mix 2D and 3D using a 'viewport node'.

Other features 
Godot contains an animation system with a GUI for skeletal animation, blending, animation trees, morphing, and real-time cutscenes. Almost any variable defined or created on a game entity can be animated. The engine uses Bullet for 3D physics simulation.

Additional features include:

History 
 Godot is a game engine that was started by Juan 'reduz' Linietsky and Ariel 'punto' Manzur in 2007. The name "Godot" was chosen due to its relation to Samuel Beckett's play Waiting for Godot, as it represents the never-ending wish of adding new features in the engine, which would get it closer to an exhaustive product, but never will.

In February 2014, the source code for Godot was released to the public on GitHub under the MIT License. Godot reached version 1.0 on 15 December 2014, marking the first stable release and the addition of lightmapping, navmesh support, and more shaders.

Version 1.1 was released on 21 May 2015, adding improved auto-completion in the code editor, a visual shader editor, a new API to the operating  system for managing screens and windows, a rewritten 2D engine, new 2D navigation polygon support, a much-improved Blender Collada exporter, and a new dark theme.

Godot joined the Software Freedom Conservancy on 4 November 2015.

Godot 2.0 was released on 23 February 2016, adding better scene instancing and inheritance, a new file system browser, multiple scene editing, and an enhanced debugger. This was followed by version 2.1 in August 2016, which introduced an asset database, profiler, and plugin API.

Version 3.0 was released on 29 January 2018, adding a brand new PBR renderer implemented in  OpenGL ES 3.0, virtual reality compatibility, and C# support (via Mono) thanks to a $24,000 donation from Microsoft. Version 3.0 also added the Bullet physics engine in addition to the engine's built-in 3D physics back end and was the first version of Godot to be included in Debian.

Godot 3.1 was released on 13 March 2019, with the most notable features being the addition of statically typed , a script class system for GDScript, and an OpenGL ES 2.0 renderer for older devices and mobile devices. Godot 3.2 was released on 29 January 2020, with the most notable features being massive documentation improvements, greatly improved C# support, and support for  glTF 2.0 files.

The lead developer, Juan Linietsky, spent most of his time working on a separate Vulkan branch that would later be merged into master for 4.0, so work on 3.2 was mostly done by other contributors. Work on 3.2 continued as a long-term support release for a year, including Godot 3.2.2 on 26 June 2020, a large patch release that added features such as OpenGL ES 2.0 batching, and C# support for iOS. On 17 March 2021, the versioning strategy was changed to better reflect semantic versioning, with a 3.3 stable branch and a 3.x branch for backporting features to a future 3.4 release. 

Godot 3.3 was released on 21 April 2021, with features such as ARM support on macOS, Android App Bundles support, MP3 support, Autodesk FBX support, WebXR support, and a web editor. 

Godot 3.4 was released on 6 November 2021 after 6 months of development, implementing missing features or bug fixes that are critical for publishing 2D and 3D games with Godot 3 and making existing features more optimized and reliable.

Godot is in the process of leaving Software Freedom Conservancy (SFC) starting 1 November 2021.

Godot 4 
Godot 4 is a version of the Godot game engine that was released on 1 March 2023. It is a major update that overhauls the rendering system, adds support for Vulkan graphics API, improves GDScript performance and usability, enhances physics and animation systems, and introduces many other features and bug fixes.

 The development of Godot 4 started in 2019 with a rewrite of the Vulkan renderer by Juan Linietsky (reduz), the lead developer of Godot.
 In 2020, several contributors joined the development team and worked on various aspects of Godot 4, such as GDScript improvements, physics engine overhaul, animation system rewrite, editor usability enhancements and more.
 In January 2022, the first alpha version of Godot 4 was released for testing by early adopters. It showcased some of the new features such as SDF-based global illumination, GPU-based particles, dynamic soft shadows and more.
 In September 2022, Godot 4 reached beta stage with improved stability and performance. It also added support for WebXR (VR on the web), C# support for Android and iOS, new audio features and more.
 On 1 March 2023, Godot 4 was officially released as a stable version after several beta builds and bug fixes. It marked a new era for Godot with enhanced graphics quality, rendering optimization techniques, accessibility features and more.

Release history 

For the most current information, refer to the Godot release policy documentation article.

Grants and awards 
On 22 June 2016, Godot received a $20,000 Mozilla Open Source Support (MOSS) “Mission Partners” award to be used to add WebSockets, WebAssembly and WebGL 2.0 support. Later, with Miguel de Icaza's support in 2017, Godot received a $24,000 donation from Microsoft to implement C# as a scripting language in Godot.

On 3 February 2020, Godot received a $250,000 Epic Games award to improve graphics rendering and the engine's built-in game development language, GDScript. On July 8, 2020, Juan Linietsky mentioned that the Epic Games award will be used to permanently hire himself and George (Marques) for 2 years in order to free donation funds for new purposes. In December 2020, Godot received a grant from Facebook Reality Labs. Later, in December 2021, Godot received another grant from Meta's Reality Labs for XR work.

On 10 February 2021, Godot received a $120,000 grant from Russian game studio Kefir. On 11 November 2021, Godot received a $100,000 grant from California-based OPGames.

Usage 
Many games by OKAM Studio have been made using Godot, including Dog Mendonça & Pizza Boy, which uses the Escoria adventure game extension. Additionally, it has been used in West Virginia's high school curriculum, due to its ease-of-use for non-programmers and what is described as a "wealth of learning materials that already exist for the software".

Community 
Godot as an international project has an active community around the world. Some community members are an admin of local Godot groups.

The lead developer of Godot, Juan Linietsky, expressed a concern that Godot is allegedly being called a cult by users of commercial software.

Since the Russian invasion of Ukraine, the "Godot Engine Russia" Discord server has been renamed to "Godot Engine Ru" and replaced the icon with an image of a "Godot kitten".

Video games with Godot Engine

See also 

 List of game engines
 Video game development

Notes

References

External links 
 
 
 Games created with Godot 

.NET game engines
2014 software
Cross-platform software
Free 3D graphics software
Free and open-source software
Free game engines
Free software programmed in C++
Game engines for Linux
IPhone video game engines
MacOS programming tools
Software using the MIT license
Video game engines
Video game IDE
Video game development software for Linux
Game engines that support Vulkan (API)